Radio Shalom Copenhagen is a local associative radio station of Jewish sensitivity based in Copenhagen, Denmark.

External links
 Official website 

Shalom Dijon, Radio
Mass media in Copenhagen
Jewish radio
Judaism in Copenhagen